Psorosticha zizyphi, the citrus leaf roller, is a moth of the family Depressariidae.

Distribution
It is found in south-east Asia, including Hong Kong, India, Iran, United Arab Emirates, Sri Lanka, New Guinea and Queensland and New South Wales in Australia.

Food plants
The larvae feed on young shoots of various trees in family Rutaceae, including Citrus limon, Citrus reticulata, Aegle marmelos, Feronia elephantum, Glycosmis pentaphylla and Murraya koenigii, as well as other plants, such as Zizyphus jujuba and Ailanthus excelsa. They live in a rolled leaf of their host plant. Pupation takes place inside the folded leaf.

The species is considered a pest on Citrus species. By rolling the leaves, they seriously damage or even destroy new growth flushes.

References

External links
Australian Insects
Australian Faunal Directory

zizyphi
Moths described in 1859